Chamicuro is an extinct South American language formerly spoken in Peru. The language was used by the Chamicuro people, who number around one hundred people. The Chamicuros currently live on a tributary of the Huallaga river, in Peru, in an area called Pampa Hermosa, though many had been dislocated to the Yavarí and Napo Rivers and to Brazil.

As with all native languages in Peru, Chamicuro was by default an official language in the area in which it was spoken. A dictionary has been published by the Chamicuro, however no children can speak the language as the community has shifted to Spanish.

There is dispute as to whether the unattested language of the Aguano people was the same language as Chamicuro. Loukotka (1968) had identified it with Chamicuro, but the Chamicuro report that the Aguano people spoke Quechua.

Phonology 
Chamicuro has five vowels: /a, e, i, o, u/. All vowels have both short and long forms.

See also
Language death

References

Languages of Peru
Arawakan languages
Indigenous languages of the South American Northwest